Marcus Birkenkrahe (born 29 December 1963 as Marcus Speh in Bad Kreuznach, Germany) is a physicist and information architect who also works as an executive coach.

After obtaining his Abitur in 1983, Birkenkrahe studied physics, mathematics and chemistry at the University of Hamburg. In 1994, he worked as a research assistant at DESY in Zeuthen near Berlin and earned his doctorate with a dissertation on multigrid computations for lattice gauge theories using object-oriented, literate programming. As co-founder and chairman of the Globewide Network Academy (GNA), he received the awards for "Best Campus-Wide Information System" and "Best Educational Site" at the First World-Wide Web conference (WWW1) in Geneva, Switzerland in  1994. Between 1995 and 2001 he worked as a corporate IT executive for Accenture and Royal Dutch Shell. He was a Fellow of the Royal Society for the encouragement of Arts, Manufactures & Commerce (RSA), London (1998–2008) and has been a registered expert and reviewer for knowledge management for the European Union since 1999. In 2002, he served as a visiting professor for knowledge management at the University of Auckland Business School where he won the "Best Paper 2002" award of the University of Auckland Business Review.

Since 2007, Birkenkrahe is a professor of management information systems at the Berlin School of Economics and Law, a German University of Applied Sciences and Head of E-Learning (since 2008). He serves as member of the editorial board for  the International Journal of Big Data Management and of the International Journal of Data Science.

References

External links 
 Personal blog.
 Faculty Profile – at Berlin School of Economics and Law.
 Wikiversity Userpage.
 

21st-century German physicists
Information architects
Academic staff of the Berlin School of Economics and Law
1963 births
Living people
University of Hamburg alumni